Bird in the Tangle is the debut solo album by The Juliana Theory frontman Brett Detar. It was released on November 9, 2010 by RavenSong Records and Mind Over Matter Records.

References

2010 albums
Mind Over Matter Records albums